Susquehanna Hall is the oldest residence building at University of Maryland, Baltimore County (UMBC). It was built in 1970, four years after the university opened.  It is home to the Honors College Living Learning Community, which is a floor where only freshmen in the Honors College live.

About Susquehanna Hall 
Susquehanna Hall is named after the Susquehanna River, a major tributary to the nearby Chesapeake Bay. It is run by the Office of Residential Life, by a Community Director and seven RAs.

Work on Susquehanna Hall 
Susquehanna is the oldest dorm at UMBC and is constantly being worked on to keep it in good condition. In 2007, UMBC's Office of Residential Life spent 1.8 million dollars on a project to improve the HVAC systems, fire sprinkler systems, roof, and main lobby. Unfortunately, the work was not finished before freshmen moved in, and the third floor was flooded when the roof leaked during a rainstorm. In 2009, work was done to put wireless internet access throughout the building and improve the fire prevention systems. Plans are being made to add an elevator to the building as part of the Patapsco Addition project in 2011.

References

University of Maryland, Baltimore County